Korit (also Romanized as Korīt; also known as Ebrāhīmābād-e Pā’īn and Korīt-e Pā’īn) is a village in Nakhlestan Rural District, in the Central District of Tabas County, South Khorasan Province, Iran. At the 2006 census, its population was 1,677, in 490 families.

References 

Populated places in Tabas County